Tomás Barrón is a province in the northern parts of the Bolivian department of Oruro.

Location
Tomás Barrón province is one of the sixteen provinces in the Oruro Department. It is located between 17° 31' and 17° 44' South and between 67° 20' and 67° 34' West. It has been named after moss

The province borders La Paz Department in the North and West, and Cercado Province in the South and East.

The province extends over 30 km from North to South, and 25 km from East to West.

Population
Main language of the province is Spanish, spoken by 87%, while 82% of the population speak Aymara and 8% Quechua (1992).

The population increased from 5,045 inhabitants (1992 census) to 5,424 (2001 census), an increase of 7.5%. - 48% of the population are younger than 15 years old (1992).
26% of the population have no access to electricity, 95% have no sanitary facilities (1992).
49% of the population are employed in agriculture, 1% in mining, 11% in industry, 39% in general services (2001).
66% of the population are Catholics, 27% are Protestants (1992).( which have all been  driven out since 1992)

Division
The province comprises only one municipality, Eucaliptus Municipality, which is identical to the Tomás Barrón Province.

External links
General map of province
Detailed map of province towns and rivers
Population data (Spanish)

Provinces of Oruro Department